Diego Collado Raya (born 9 January 2001) is a Spanish footballer who plays as a left winger for Villarreal CF B.

Club career
Collado was born in Granada, Andalusia, and joined Villarreal CF's youth setup at the age of 12, from Granada 74 CF. He made his senior debut with the C-team on 13 January 2019, coming on as a second-half substitute for Ipalibo Jack in a 1–0 Tercera División home loss against Atlético Saguntino.

On 22 August 2019, Collado signed a contract with the Yellow Submarine until 2023, and subsequently started to feature with the reserves in Segunda División B. He featured regularly with the B's during the 2021–22 season, as the team achieved promotion to Segunda División, and further extended his contract until 2025 on 2 August 2022.

Collado made his professional debut with the B-side on 14 August 2022, starting in a 2–0 away win over Racing de Santander.

References

External links

2001 births
Living people
Spanish footballers
Footballers from Granada
Association football wingers
Segunda División players
Primera Federación players
Segunda División B players
Tercera División players
Villarreal CF C players
Villarreal CF B players
Spain youth international footballers